John Reagan (born August 5, 1946) is an American politician who has served in the New Hampshire Senate from the 17th district since 2012. He previously served in the New Hampshire House of Representatives from the Rockingham 1 district from 2006 to 2012.

References

1946 births
Living people
Republican Party members of the New Hampshire House of Representatives
Republican Party New Hampshire state senators
21st-century American politicians